Cattleya perrinii, commonly known as the Perrin's sophronitis, is a species of orchid endemic to southeastern Brazil.

References

External links 

perrinii
Endemic orchids of Brazil